Magic Pie may refer to:

 "Magic Pie", a song by the Flower Kings from Flower Power, 1999
 "Magic Pie", a song by Kazaky, 2014
 "Magic Pie", a song by  Oasis from Be Here Now, 1997